Beaumont-Louestault is a commune in the department of Indre-et-Loire, central France. The municipality was established on 1 January 2017 by merging the former communes of Beaumont-la-Ronce (the head office) and Louestault.

See also 
Communes of the Indre-et-Loire department

References 

Communes of Indre-et-Loire
Touraine